Drum 'n' Bass 'n' Steel is a 12" vinyl release of a collaboration between Luke Vibert and BJ Cole.

Track listing
Side A
"Drum 'n' Bass 'n' Steel" - 5:46
Side B
"Tom 'n' Us" - 4:04
Bass guitar: Tom Jenkinson
"Party Animal" - 4:00

References

1999 albums
Luke Vibert albums
B. J. Cole albums
Collaborative albums